Yeshaq, the Ethiopian and Eritrean equivalent of "Isaac," can refer to multiple people:

Yeshaq I, Emperor of Ethiopia (r. 1414-29)
Bahr negus Yeshaq, Bahr negus of Medri Bahri during the late 16th century
Yeshaq Iyasu pretender to the Ethiopian throne in 1685